Cân i Gymru 2010 was the forty-first edition of S4C's Cân i Gymru, an annual Welsh singing contest. The 2010 edition was broadcast live on 28 February 2010 from Venue Cymru, Llandudno. The show was also available to watch online as well as a live radio commentary. The winner was given an invitation to represent Wales at the Pan Celtic Festival.

Format
S4C and Avanti invited composers and authors to send in their songs from 15 October 2009 and were given a closing date of 11 December 2009. Songs had to be submitted on a CD, cassette or MP3 file along with a submission form. Other rules stated that:
 the song must be in Welsh
 entrants must be over 16 on the closing date
 the lyrics and song must be original
 the song must not have been made available before the closing date

A panel of judges will evaluate each entry before submitting a shortlist of eight songs which will be chosen to be performed live on the show. The winning composer(s)/author(s) will be awarded £10,000 and an invitation to enter their song into the Pan Celtic Festival in Ireland. The second place entry will receive a £2,000 prize.

Former Catatonia band member Owen Powell will chair the Cân i Gymru jury and he said of the 2010 show "Cân i Gymru is a unique competition which offers both budding and established composers the chance to gain wider recognition for their work. The live final is always a fantastic occasion – and with a top prize of £10,000 as well as the chance to represent Wales in Ireland, I’m confident the response this year will be as strong as ever."

The winner of Cân i Gymru 2010 will be decided by a 50% jury vote and 50% televote.

Entrants

References

External links
  Cân i Gymru website
 S4C website

2010 in Wales
S4C original programming
2010
2010 song contests